is a Japanese politician of the Democratic Party of Japan, a member of the House of Councillors in the Diet (national legislature). A native of Ōfunato, Iwate and graduate of Nihon University, he was elected to the House of Councillors for the first time in 2007 after serving in the Iwate Prefectural Assembly for five terms since 1987.

References

External links 
 Official website in Japanese.

1951 births
Living people
Members of the House of Councillors (Japan)
Members of the Iwate Prefectural Assembly
Democratic Party of Japan politicians
Nihon University alumni